The Northwestern Mutual Tower and Commons is a 550-foot, 32-story skyscraper located at 805 East Mason Street in Milwaukee, Wisconsin. On September 25, 2013, Northwestern Mutual unveiled the design for its new office tower. The company's former 16-story building was demolished to make room for the new tower. The new tower was completed in 2017 at an estimated cost of $450 million. The grand opening was on August 21, 2017.

At , the Northwestern Mutual Tower and Commons is the second-tallest building in Milwaukee.

In October 2015, Northwestern Mutual announced plans to build a 34-story residential tower with retail and parking in downtown Milwaukee. 7Seventy7 was completed in 2018.

References

Skyscraper office buildings in Milwaukee